Scleromitrula is a genus of fungi within the Rutstroemiaceae family.

References

External links
Index Fungorum

Helotiales